Berry-Strawberry (translit. Yagoda-Klubnika) is a 2011 comedy film in the Udmurt language directed by Piotr Pałgan based on a story by Darali Leli, who wrote the screenplay. The film was produced by Udmurt-Polish "Inwis kinopottonni". Before the film was released, the history of Udmurt cinema was that of only two films, "The Rivals" (1929) and "The Shadow of Alangasar" (1994). The film's budget has not been revealed.

Cast
Elena Frolova, Konstantin Nikitin, Irina Krestyaninova, Leonid Gusev, Galina Volkova, Yuriy Eroshkin, Roman Boltachev, Sergei Nagovitsyn, Nikolai Smirnov, Anna Smirnova, Lyubov Kiseleva, Anatoly Galihanov, Maria Imbirnaya, Maxim Knyazev, Anastasia Petrova, Elena Baykova, Alexander Korenkov, as well as group MALPAN and villagers Purogurt.

External links 
 uzy-bory.ru 
 uralistica.com/events/uzybory-party-in-moscowuzybory 
 uralistica.com/photo/album/show?id=2161342%3AAlbum%3A75101&xg_source=activity 
 http://www.udmort.ru/uzy-bory-pervyj-molodezhnyj-film-na-udmurtskom-yazyke.html/udmort.ru/uzy-bory-pervyj-molodezhnyj-film-na-udmurtskom-yazyke.html

2011 films
2011 comedy films
Udmurt-language films
Russian comedy films